The 1997 NCAA Division I women's soccer tournament (also known as the 1997 NCAA Women's College Cup) was the 16th annual single-elimination tournament to determine the national champion of NCAA Division I women's collegiate soccer. The semifinals and championship game were played at the UNCG Soccer Stadium in Greensboro, North Carolina during December 1997.

North Carolina defeated Connecticut in the final, 2–0, to win their fourteenth national title. Coached by Anson Dorrance, the Tar Heels finished the season 27–0–1.

The most outstanding offensive player was Robin Confer from North Carolina, and the most outstanding defensive player was Siri Mullinix, also from North Carolina. Confer and Mullinix, along with twelve other players, were named to the All-tournament team.

The tournament's leading scorer, with 5 goals, was Sara Whalen from Connecticut.

Qualification

All Division I women's soccer programs were eligible to qualify for the tournament. The tournament field remained at 32 teams although it would expand again, to 48, in 1998.

Play-in games

Teams

Bracket

All-tournament team
Mandy Clemens, Santa Clara
Robin Confer, North Carolina (most outstanding offensive player)
Carey Dorn, Connecticut
Lorrie Fair, North Carolina
Jacqui Little, Santa Clara
Holly Manthei, Notre Dame
Siri Mullinix, North Carolina (most outstanding defensive player)
Cindy Parlow, North Carolina
Tiffany Roberts, North Carolina
Heather Stone, Connecticut
Jenny Streiffer, Notre Dame
Jen Tietjen, Notre Dame
Sara Whalen, Connecticut
Staci Wilson, North Carolina

See also 
 NCAA Division II Women's Soccer Championship
 NCAA Division III Women's Soccer Championship

References

NCAA
NCAA Women's Soccer Championship
 
NCAA Division I Women's Soccer Tournament
NCAA Division I Women's Soccer Tournament
NCAA Division I Women's Soccer Tournament
Women's sports in North Carolina